Janet Margaret McLean  is a New Zealand law academic. She is currently a full professor at the University of Auckland. Mcleans' interests include constitutional law, administrative law, legal method, comparative human rights law and common law theory. She is a Fellow of the Royal Society Te Apārangi.

Career 

After a LLB(Hons) at Victoria University of Wellington and an LL.M. at the University of Michigan, McLean worked for the New Zealand Law Commission and Victoria University of Wellington and then the University of Auckland from 1991 to 2006. Moving to University of Dundee as full professor, she returned to Auckland in 2011, again as full professor.

In December 2019, McLean was appointed as a Queen's Counsel.

In March 2021, McLean was made Fellow of the Royal Society Te Apārangi, in recognition that she "has transformed colonial and contemporary understandings of the nature of the Crown in the United Kingdom and Aotearoa New Zealand, including in the Tiriti o Waitangi."

Selected works 

 The province of administrative law 1997.  (with Michael Taggart)
 Property and the constitution 1999. 
 Searching for the state in British legal thought : competing conceptions of the public sphere 2012.

Personal life 

McLean is married to Tim Mulgan, professor of philosophy formerly at St Andrews University and then of the University of Auckland.

References

External links
 

Living people
Year of birth missing (living people)
New Zealand women academics
20th-century New Zealand lawyers
Victoria University of Wellington alumni
University of Michigan Law School alumni
Academic staff of the Victoria University of Wellington
Academic staff of the University of Auckland
Alumni of the University of Dundee
Fellows of the Royal Society of New Zealand
21st-century New Zealand lawyers